Prestmåsøya is an uninhabited island in Sørfold Municipality in Nordland county, Norway. The  island lies at the eastern end of the Folda fjord where it splits into the Nordfolda and Sørfolda.

See also
List of islands of Norway

References

Islands of Nordland
Sørfold
Uninhabited islands of Norway